The Chevron B71 was a sports prototype race car, designed, developed and built by Chevron, for IMSA's World Sports Car (WSC) class, in 1995. A modified development of this car, called the Kopf Keiler K2, closely based on the Chevron B71, debuted at the 1997 24 Hours of Daytona.

References

Chevron racing cars
Sports prototypes
24 Hours of Le Mans race cars